Dabhad is a village in Kheralu Taluka in Mahesana district of Gujarat State, India.

References 

Villages in Mehsana district